Józef Henryk Przytycki (born 14 October 1953 in Warsaw, Poland), is a Polish mathematician specializing in the fields of knot theory and topology.

Academic background 
Przytycki received a Master of Science degree in mathematics from University of Warsaw in 1977 and a PhD in mathematics from Columbia University (1981) advised by Joan Birman. Przytycki then returned to Poland, where he became an assistant professor at the University of Warsaw. From 1986 to 1995 he held visiting positions at the University of British Columbia, the University of Toronto, Michigan State University, the Institute for Advanced Study in Princeton, New Jersey, the University of California, Riverside, Odense University, and the University of California, Berkeley.

In 1995 he joined the Mathematics Department at George Washington University in Washington, D.C., where he became a professor in 1999.  According to the Mathematics Genealogy Project, he has supervised 16 PhD students (as of 2022).

Research 
Przytycki co-authored more than 100 research papers, 25 conference proceedings and 2 books.

In 1987, Przytycki and Pawel Traczyk published a paper that included a description of what is now called the HOMFLY(PT) polynomial.  Postal delays prevented Przytycki and Traczyk from receiving full recognition alongside the other six discoverers.  Przytycki also introduced skein modules in a paper published in 1991; see also his entry in the online Encyclopedia of Mathematics.

Przytycki has co-organized the conference Knots in Washington each semester since 1995. He also co-organized several international Knot Theory conferences in Europe, for example Knots in Poland (1995, 2003 and 2010), Knots in Hellas (1998 and 2016), and the Advanced School and Conference on Knot Theory and its Applications to Physics and Biology, Trieste, Italy (2009).

Personal life 
Józef Przytycki is married to computational biologist and mathematician Teresa Przytycka (born 1958). They have two sons.

References

External links
 
 

1953 births
Living people
Polish emigrants to the United States
20th-century Polish mathematicians
21st-century Polish mathematicians
20th-century American mathematicians
21st-century American mathematicians
Topologists
University of Warsaw alumni
Columbia Graduate School of Arts and Sciences alumni
George Washington University faculty
Academic staff of the University of Warsaw
Institute for Advanced Study visiting scholars
University of British Columbia people